Sunyer I was count of Empúries and Roussillon (with the pagus of Perelada) from 834 to 841.

He was the son of Count Belló I of Carcassonne.

Sunyer I was deposed in 841 due to a new policy of the Frankish Emperor, he died in 848. His eldest son, Sunyer II, was later a count of Empúries and Roussillon (with Perelada) and another son, Delà, was an associate count of his brother.

References 

Year of birth missing
848 deaths
Nobility of the Carolingian Empire
Counts of Empúries
Counts of Roussillon
9th-century rulers in Europe
9th-century Visigothic people